Roman Steinberg (after 1938, Roman Kivimägi; 5 April 1900 – 30 May 1939), was an Estonian Greco-Roman wrestling bronze medal winner in middleweight class at the 1924 Summer Olympics in Paris, France. Steinberg was also three times Estonian wrestling champion 1921–1923, coached by Robert Oksa.

He died after contracting tuberculosis, age 39, and was buried at Alexander Nevsky Cemetery, Tallinn.

See also
 Estonia at the 1924 Summer Olympics

References

External links
 
 
 
 
 
 Picture of Roman Steinberg at the Estonian Olympic Committee webpage
 
 GBR Athletics
 FILA Wrestling Database

1900 births
1939 deaths
People from Lääneranna Parish
People from Kreis Wiek
Olympic wrestlers of Estonia
Olympic bronze medalists for Estonia
Wrestlers at the 1924 Summer Olympics
Estonian male sport wrestlers
Olympic medalists in wrestling
Medalists at the 1924 Summer Olympics
20th-century Estonian people
20th-century deaths from tuberculosis
Tuberculosis deaths in Estonia